California's 22nd congressional district is a congressional district in the U.S. state of California. It is represented by David Valadao, who formerly represented California’s 21st congressional district from 2013 to 2019 and 2021 to 2023. It was one of 18 districts that voted for Joe Biden in the 2020 presidential election while being won or held by a Republican in 2022. It is also the most Democratic district in the country to be held by a Republican, with a partisan lean of D+5.

Following redistricting in 2021, the district is still in the San Joaquin Valley. It includes most of Kings County and parts of Tulare and Kern Counties. It includes the east side of Bakersfield; the west and south sides of Tulare, the south side of Hanford; and all of Porterville, Lindsay, Shafter, Wasco, Delano, McFarland, Arvin, Lamont, and Corcoran. The new 22nd is a majority-Latino district.

Recent election results from statewide races

List of members representing the district

Election results

1942

1944

1946

1948

1950

1952

1954

1956

1958

1960

1962

1964

1966

1968

1970

1972

1974

1976

1978

1980

1982

1984

1986

1988

1990

1992

1994

1996

1998 (special)

1998

2000

2002

2004

2006

2008

2010

2012

2014

2016

2018

2020

2022 (special)

Historical district boundaries

See also

 List of United States congressional districts

References

External links
GovTrack.us: California's 22nd congressional district
RAND California Election Returns: District Definitions
California Voter Foundation map - CD22

22
Government of Fresno County, California
Government of Tulare County, California
San Joaquin Valley
Clovis, California
Visalia, California
Constituencies established in 1943
1943 establishments in California